Unha (Galaxy) is a North Korean space launch rocket.

Unha, or Uh-Ha or variation, may also refer to:

Places
 Unha (Naut Aran), Lleida, Catalonia, Spain; a municipal entity
 Unha Line, Manp'o, Chagang, North Korea; an electrified rail line
 Unha station, Manp'o, Chagang, North Korea; a train station
 Mirae Unha Tower or Unha Tower (Galaxy Tower), Mirae Street, Pyongyang, North Korea; a 53-storey building
 Unha Village, Unjon County, North P'yŏngan, North Korea

Other uses
 Eun-ha, a Korean given name also romanized as "Un-ha"
 Korea Unha General Trading, a North Korean company

See also

 
 
 
 Hasanuddin University (UnHas), Makassar, South Sulawesi, Indonesia
 United Nations Humanitarian Air Service (UNHAS), an airline operated by the UN